Louise Mieritz (born 30 April 1971 in Århus) is a Danish actress, best known for her roles in the Dogme 95 films The Idiots and .

Partial filmography 
 The Idiots (1998)
  (2003)
  (2004)
 Anklaget (2005)
  (2005)
 The Boss of It All (2006)
 Max Embarrassing 2 (2011)

References

External links 
 

1971 births
Danish film actresses
Danish television actresses
Living people
People from Aarhus